Shellback may refer to:

Shellback (record producer), from Karlshamn, Sweden
Shellback, California, former settlement
Shellback Wilderness, White Pine County, Nevada, U.S., wilderness area
Shellback Island, Victoria, Australia
a sailor who has participated in a line-crossing ceremony